The Lapinjärvi church village (also known as Lapinjärvi;) is the largest village and administrative center of the Lapinjärvi municipality, located on the eastern shore of Lake Lapinjärvi in Uusimaa, Finland. The main road connection from the church village to Helsinki or Kouvola is Highway 6 (Vt 6), along which the village is located.

The Lapinjärvi village houses most of Lapinjärvi's offices and municipal hall, and Finnish and Swedish-language primary schools also operate there. Sights in the church village include Lieutenant's residence of Brofogdas from the 18th century and the local museum of Kycklings. There are two churches and two cemeteries located in the church village area.

See also
 Myrskylä (village)

References

External links
 Lapinjärven kirkonkylä - Museovirasto (in Finnish)
 Lapinjärvi - Husulanmäki.fi

Lapinjärvi (municipality)
Villages in Finland